The 1973–74 Iraqi National First Division was a football tournament organised by the Iraq Football Association (IFA) in the 1973–74 season, which was formed as the top-tier national league in Iraq to replace the Iraq Central FA League and the Basra, Kirkuk and Mosul leagues. The tournament began on 11 October 1973.

Matches that ended in a draw were settled via penalty shootout (with no extra time), with the winner of the shootout earning one point. Al-Quwa Al-Jawiya won the league title with a total of 23 points, and they also won the regional Iraq FA Baghdad Cup knockout tournament in the same season, led by coach Abdelilah Mohammed Hassan.

From the 1974–75 season, the competition was replaced by the Iraqi National Clubs First Division which was only open to clubs and not institute-representative teams.

Name changes
Al-Mushat renamed to Quwat Al-Nasr.

Regional qualifiers
To decide which six teams from other provinces would participate alongside the eight teams from the 1972–73 Iraq Central FA First Division, 14 teams were split into three groups with the top two in each group qualifying for the final league competition. The qualifying matches were played from 24–31 August 1973 in the cities of Erbil, Babil and Basra. The six teams that qualified were Al-Minaa, Al-Samawa, Babil, Shortat Erbil, Shortat Sulaymaniya and Al-Rafidain.

League table

Results

Top goalscorers

References

External links
 Iraq Football Association

Iraq
League